The Hedgpeth Heights are mainly snow-covered heights,  long and with peaks rising to , located  southwest of the Quam Heights in the Anare Mountains of Victoria Land, Antarctica. The feature was first mapped by the United States Geological Survey from surveys and U.S. Navy air photos, 1960–63, and was named by the Advisory Committee on Antarctic Names for Joel W. Hedgpeth, a United States Antarctic Research Program biologist at McMurdo Station, 1967–68, and Palmer Station, 1968–69. These topographical features lie situated on the Pennell Coast, a portion of Antarctica lying between Cape Williams and Cape Adare.

See also
Allowitz Peak
Tenaza Peak

References

Mountains of Victoria Land
Pennell Coast